Cymothoe colmanti is a butterfly in the family Nymphalidae. It is found in the northern part of the Democratic Republic of the Congo and the Central African Republic.

References

External links
Images representing Cymothoe colmanti at Consortium for the Barcode of Life

Butterflies described in 1898
Cymothoe (butterfly)
Butterflies of Africa
Taxa named by Per Olof Christopher Aurivillius